James Andrew Corcoran (March 31, 1820 in Charleston, South Carolina – July 16, 1889 in Philadelphia, Pennsylvania) was the editor of the United States Catholic Miscellany, the first distinctively Catholic literary periodical published in the United States and the theologian for the bishops of the United States in the First Vatican Council.  He authored "the Spalding formula", an attempted compromise during the First Vatican Council on the doctrine of papal infallibility. At the age of 14 he was sent to the College of Propaganda, Rome, where was ordained a priest on 21 December 1842. He was the first person native to the Carolinas who received priestly orders. He remained a year longer in Rome to complete his studies and was made doctor in sacred theology.

He learned to read the literatures and dialects of Western and Northern Europe, and spoke Latin fluently, as can be seen in the text of the Second of the Plenary Councils of Baltimore. In addition, he was a profound Semitic scholar, with a special predilection for Syriac. On the death of Bishop John England in 1842 he was recalled to Charleston, where he taught in the seminary, doing parochial work in the meantime, and in conjunction with Dr. Lynch edited the United States Catholic Miscellany. His position as a Catholic editor involved him in many controversies, one being on the life and teachings of Martin Luther, for which Corcoran procured from Europe an abundance of Lutherana. He had made great headway with the preparation of a life of Luther, when in 1861 his manuscript and library were destroyed by fire. 

During the American Civil War his sympathies were with the South, and the end of the struggle found him rector of a parish in Wilmington, North Carolina, where he stayed during an epidemic of cholera which decimated his congregation. He was made secretary to the Provincial Councils of Baltimore of 1855 and 1858; also secretary in chief at the Second Plenary Council of 1866. He was one of the editors of the complete works of Bishop England. 

In 1868 he was chosen by the unanimous voice of the American hierarchy as their theologian on the commission preparatory to the Vatican Council. He was assigned to the doctrinal as an Olive branch, in which the doctrine is rather implied than flatly stated. But the compromise was rejected. While at the council, Bishop Wood of Philadelphia, his school-fellow at the Propaganda, perfected arrangements by which Dr. Corcoran took a theological chair in the newly opened seminary at Overbrook, near Philadelphia. This position he retained until death, declining, on the plea of advancing years, a call to The Catholic University of America in Washington. 

In 1876 the American Catholic Quarterly Review was founded, and Corcoran was made chief editor, assisted by George Dering Wolff. His articles and book reviews were the principal source of its success. (For a list of his contributions see General Index of the Review, Philadelphia, 1900, p. 15.)

In 1883, when the archbishops of the United States were invited to Rome to prepare for the Third Plenary Council of Baltimore, they took Dr. Corcoran with them as secretary, and, at their request, he was permitted to be present and take notes at the sessions held with the three cardinals appointed by Pope Leo XIII as a special commission. The following year he was made a domestic prelate and assisted as secretary at the Plenary Council.

References

External links
 

19th-century American Roman Catholic theologians
Writers from Charleston, South Carolina
Writers from Philadelphia
1820 births
1889 deaths
Catholics from South Carolina
19th-century American Roman Catholic priests